Payton is a given name in use in English speaking countries. One source indicates the name comes from a surname derived from a place name meaning "Pœga's town" in Old English. Another source indicates the name means "fighting man's estate.".

The name is popular for both boys and girls in the United States. It was the 278th most popular name for American boys born there in 2007 and the 152nd most popular name for girl. It was the 85th most popular name for girls born in British Columbia, Canada in 2006.  Peyton, a spelling variant, was the 125th most popular name for boys born in 2007 in the United States and the 121st most popular name for girls.

Notable people with the given name Payton include
Payton Banks (born 1981), American professional wrestler
Payton Haas (born 1979), American actor
Payton Hazzard (born 1993), Grenadian sprinter
Payton Henry (born 1997), American baseball player
Payton Jordan (1917–2009), American track and field coach
Payton Otterdahl (born 1996), American shot putter
Payton Pritchard (born 1998), American basketball player
Payton Ridenour (born 2002), American BMX rider
Payton Sandfort (born 2002), American basketball player
Payton Smith (born 2000), American singer-songwriter
Payton Thorne (born 2001), American football player
Payton Turner (born 1999), American football player
Payton Willis (born 1998), American basketball player in the Israeli Basketball Premier League

See also
Peyton (name), given name and surname
Payton (surname)

References

English-language unisex given names
Feminine given names
Masculine given names
English unisex given names